The following table summarizes the operational strength of the German air force, or Luftwaffe, by general category of aircraft. The period covered is World War II from 1940 to 1945, starting at the time of the Battle of Britain.

See also
Luftwaffe
World War II

References and links

Stengths